Afroceto is a genus of African araneomorph spiders in the family Trachelidae, first described by R. Lyle & C. R. Haddad in 2010.

Species
 it contains sixteen species:
Afroceto africana (Simon, 1910) – Namibia, South Africa, Lesotho
Afroceto ansieae Lyle, 2015 – South Africa
Afroceto bisulca Lyle & Haddad, 2010 – South Africa
Afroceto bulla Lyle & Haddad, 2010 – South Africa
Afroceto capensis Lyle & Haddad, 2010 – South Africa
Afroceto coenosa (Simon, 1897) – South Africa
Afroceto corcula Lyle & Haddad, 2010 – South Africa
Afroceto croeseri Lyle & Haddad, 2010 – South Africa
Afroceto dippenaarae Lyle, 2015 – South Africa
Afroceto flabella Lyle & Haddad, 2010 – South Africa
Afroceto gracilis Lyle & Haddad, 2010 – South Africa
Afroceto martini (Simon, 1897) (type) – East, Southern Africa
Afroceto plana Lyle & Haddad, 2010 – South Africa, Malawi
Afroceto porrecta Lyle & Haddad, 2010 – South Africa
Afroceto rotunda Lyle & Haddad, 2010 – South Africa
Afroceto spicula Lyle & Haddad, 2010 – South Africa

References

External links

Araneomorphae genera
Trachelidae